These are the Canadian number-one albums of 1979 as compiled by RPM.

References

See also
List of Canadian number-one singles of 1979

1979
1979 record charts
1979 in Canadian music